Brian Stenger (born January 16, 1947) is a former American football linebacker. He played for the Pittsburgh Steelers from 1969 to 1972 and for the New England Patriots in 1973.

References

1947 births
Living people
American football linebackers
Notre Dame Fighting Irish football players
Pittsburgh Steelers players
New England Patriots players